980 Anacostia is a minor planet orbiting the Sun that was discovered by American astronomer George Henry Peters on 21 November 1921. The name recognizes the Anacostia River and an historic neighborhood of the same name in the city of Washington D.C.

Measurements using the adaptive optics system at the W. M. Keck Observatory give a diameter of 70 ± 6 km. This is 23% smaller than the diameter estimated from the IRAS observatory data. The size ratio between the major and minor axes is 1.09.

Polarimetric study of this asteroid reveals anomalous properties that suggests the regolith consists of a mixture of low and high albedo material. This may have been caused by fragmentation of an asteroid substrate with the spectral properties of CO3/CV3 carbonaceous chondrites.

References

External links 
 
 

000980
Discoveries by George Peters
Named minor planets
000980
000980
19211121